Mieszewo  is a German/Polish village in the administrative district of Gmina Węgorzyno, within Łobez County, West Pomeranian Voivodeship, in north-western Poland.

References

Mieszewo